Daubeney Academy (formerly Daubeney Middle School) is an 11–16 coeducational secondary school located in Kempston, Bedfordshire, England. It was established in 1972 and is part of the Chiltern Learning Trust.

History 
The school was established in 1972 as Daubeney Middle School, a middle school for ages 9–13, named after the Manor of Kempston Daubeney (named after Sir Giles Daubeney and his descendants). It converted to an academy in April 2012 and renamed Daubeney Academy. It became a secondary school after changing its age range to 11–16 following a three-year transition that began in 2017.

Academics
Daubeney Academy offers GCSEs, BTECs and OCR Nationals as programmes of study for pupils.

References

External links 
 

Kempston
Academies in the Borough of Bedford
Secondary schools in the Borough of Bedford
Educational institutions established in 1972
1972 establishments in England